Spodris is a Latvian male given name. The name day of persons named Spodris is January 28.

References 

Masculine given names
Latvian masculine given names